Etruscology is the study of the ancient civilization of the Etruscans in Italy, which was incorporated into an expanding Roman Empire during the period of Rome's Middle Republic. Since the Etruscans were politically and culturally influential in pre-Republican Rome, many Etruscologists are also scholars of the history, archaeology, and culture of Rome.

The premier scholarly journal of Etruscan Studies is Studi Etruschi. A recent addition to the scholarly literature is the American journal, Etruscan Studies: Journal of the Etruscan Foundation, which began publication in 1994. A more informal organ is Etruscan News and the accompanying cyber-publication Etruscan News Online.

Thomas Dempster (b. 1570, d. 1625), Scottish scholar and historian, is perhaps the godfather of Etruscology. Under the patronage of Grand Duke Cosimo II of Etruria, Dempster researched and wrote De Etruria Regali Libri Septem in Latin.

Prominent Etruscologists, past and present, include Pericle Ducati, Ranuccio Bianchi Bandinelli, Massimo Pallottino, Mauro Cristofani, Giovanni Colonna, Giulio Giglioli, Giovannangelo Camporeale, Jacques Heurgon, Dominique Briquel, Carlo De Simone, Helmut Rix, L. Bouke van der Meer, George Dennis, Guglielmo Maetzke, Nancy T. DeGrummond, Sybille Haynes, and Larissa Bonfante. Other scholars who focus more on the Etruscan influence on Rome include, R. E. A. Palmer, John F. Hall, and H. H. Scullard.

Various organizations promote Etruscology. The Etruscan Foundation supports Etruscan scholarship in the United States and abroad. The foundation provides internships and fellowships, and publishes the journal Etruscan Studies. It also sponsors an annual lecture.

Footnotes

 
Etruscans